Free base (freebase, free-base) is the conjugate base (deprotonated) form of an amine, as opposed to its conjugate acid (protonated) form. The amine is often an alkaloid, such as nicotine, cocaine, morphine, and ephedrine, or derivatives thereof.
Freebasing is a more efficient method of self-administering alkaloids via the smoking route.

Properties 
Some alkaloids are more stable as ionic salts than as free base. The salts usually exhibit greater water solubility. Common counterions include chloride, bromide, sulfate, phosphate, nitrate, acetate, oxalate, citrate, and tartrate. Ammonium salts formed from the acid-base reaction with hydrochloric acid are known as hydrochlorides. For example, compare the free base hydroxylamine (NH2OH) with the salt hydroxylamine hydrochloride (NH3OH+ Cl−).

Freebasing
Cocaine hydrochloride ("powder cocaine") cannot be smoked as it decomposes at the high temperatures produced by smoking. Free base cocaine, on the other hand, has a melting point of 98°C and is volatile at temperatures above 90°C, and is therefore actively smokable.

After inhalation the alkaloid is absorbed into the blood stream and rapidly transported throughout the body. However, since blood is buffered with carbonate at physiological pH (near 7.4), free-base amines will be rapidly converted back into their acid form. In fact, 94.19% of cocaine will exist as the acid form under equilibrium at pH=7.4, calculated using the Henderson-Hasselbalch equation assuming a pKa of 8.61.

A small portion (5.81%) of cocaine will remain as free-base and pass through the blood-brain barrier; according to Le Chatelier's principle the acid form of cocaine will be continually converted to free-base as the base form is continually removed across the blood-brain barrier. Extraction kits for converting the hydrochloride to the base are commercially available. Freebasing also tends to remove water-soluble impurities and adulterants such as sugars (lactose, sucrose, glucose, mannitol, inositol), which are often added to street cocaine. Cocaine freebase is only slightly soluble in water (1 in 600 of water) as compared to the high solubility of cocaine hydrochloride (1 in 0.5 of water).

Preparation 
The free base form of cocaine is prepared from cocaine hydrochloride by extracting the cocaine with an alkaline solution (sodium hydroxide or ammonia) and adding a non-polar solvent such as diethyl ether or benzene. The mixture separates into two layers, the top solvent layer containing the dissolved cocaine. The solvent is then evaporated leaving almost pure cocaine crystals, white and crumbly like feta cheese. Alternatively, the free base can be obtained using an organic chemistry technique called trituration. Trituration of the free base from cocaine hydrochloride (or "cooking") is done by dissolving the cocaine hydrochloride in water over constant heat, while simultaneously adding a base (such as baking soda) to form the free base cocaine. The free base of cocaine forms a solid "rock", pieces of which can be smoked directly (crack cocaine).

History 
The smoking of cocaine base first appeared in the United States in 1974 and was mostly confined to the state of California. The first hospital admission for a problem related to free-basing was in 1975, the year in which extraction kits and smoking accessories became commercially available. In 1978, distribution of these accessories or paraphernalia spread from California throughout the United States. In 1979, only 1% of cocaine-related hospital admissions involved the use of free base, but by 1982 this figure had increased to 7%.

Other 
In South America, coca leaves are traditionally chewed with a quantity of an alkaline lime substance ("llipta") typically derived from the ashes remaining after burning plants, shells or limestone.

In South America, coca paste, also known as cocaine base or basuco and, therefore, often confused with cocaine freebase in North America, is relatively inexpensive and is widely used by low-income populations.

References

Alkaloids
Bases (chemistry)
Drug culture